Steven Lewis Point,  (Xwĕ lī qwĕl tĕl) (born July 28, 1951) is a Canadian jurist and current chancellor of the University of British Columbia. He served as the 28th Lieutenant Governor of British Columbia from 2007 to 2012. He also served as the chair of the advisory committee on the safety and security of vulnerable women, a committee that provides community-based guidance to the implementation of the recommendations from the Missing Women Commission of Inquiry.

From 1975 to 1999, Point served as Chief of the Skowkale First Nation. From 1994 to 1999 he served as Tribal Chair of the Stó:lō Nation.

Education

Career
From 1986 to 1989 he practiced criminal law and native law as a partner in the law firm of Point and Shirley.  He worked for Citizenship and Immigration Canada as an immigration adjudicator for several years, starting in about 1989, at its refugee backlog office in Vancouver. In 1999, he became a British Columbia Provincial Court judge. On February 28, 2005, he became Chief Commissioner of the British Columbia Treaty Commission.

His appointment as Lieutenant Governor was announced on September 4, 2007, by Prime Minister Stephen Harper. He assumed his duties in a ceremony at the Legislative Assembly of British Columbia on October 1, 2007. As the Queen's viceroy in British Columbia, he was styled His Honour while in office and retains the style of The Honourable for life.

On December 17, 2012, Point was appointed chair of an Advisory Committee under a one-year contract that allowed him to bill up to $220,000 in that year.  The position required him to assist the Minister of Justice to implement the recommendations dealing primarily with police reform and public safety made by Wally Oppal in his Inquiry Report released December 12, 2012.  On May 17, 2013, Point resigned from his position as chair on the grounds that lawsuits commenced by the children of missing women prevented him from fulfilling his mandate.  Members of the Advisory Committee and family members expressed doubt about this reason on the basis that Point had expressed his intention to resign before the children's lawsuits were filed, and on the basis that there is no logical or practical connection between his work as chair of the Advisory Committee and the lawsuits.

On February 20, 2014, Point was re-appointed as a provincial court judge, effective March 3, 2014. He retired from office on October 31, 2018.

On June 18, 2020, Point was introduced as the 19th Chancellor of the University of British Columbia, succeeding Lindsay Gordon from July 1, 2020.

In 2022, a residential street in Richmond, British Columbia, was renamed from Trutch Avenue to Point Avenue due to the racism associated with Joseph Trutch, the first lieutenant governor of British Columbia, and to honour Point.

Awards
 Queen Elizabeth II Golden Jubilee Medal, 2002
 Order of British Columbia, 2007
 Knight of The Most Venerable Order of the Hospital of St. John of Jerusalem, 2008
 Queen Elizabeth II Diamond Jubilee Medal, 2012

Honorary degrees
Point has received many honorary degrees in recognition of his service to British Columbia and to Canada. These include:

Honorary degrees

Arms

See also
 Notable Aboriginal people of Canada
 The Canadian Crown and Aboriginal peoples

References

Steven Point appointed B.C.’s new lieutenant-governor
 Premier's Statement On New Lieutenant-Governor
Prime Minister announces appointment of Steven Point as Lieutenant-Governor of British Columbia
British Columbia Treaty Commission - Commissioner Biographies

External links
  Lieutenant Governor & Government House Website

1951 births
Living people
21st-century Canadian politicians
20th-century First Nations people
21st-century First Nations people
First Nations academics
First Nations judges
First Nations lawyers
Indigenous leaders in British Columbia
Indspire Awards
Judges in British Columbia
Knights of Justice of the Order of St John
Lawyers in British Columbia
Lieutenant Governors of British Columbia
Members of the Order of British Columbia
People from Chilliwack
Sto:lo people
Peter A. Allard School of Law alumni
Academic staff of the University of British Columbia